Cripple Creek is an unincorporated community in Wythe County, Virginia, United States. The community's post office first opened in 1888 and closed in 2011. Early iron furnaces were constructed nearby ca.1800.

The area around Cripple Creek includes the creek known as Cripple Creek and was significant geologically. The Cripple Creek Valley was mined for iron ore and had furnaces and mills. Rail service came in the late 19th century. It now borders a large park and is used by anglers and hikers. Cripple Creek Road passes through the area. There is debate about whether the folk song "Cripple Creek" is about the area in Virginia or Colorado, both mining areas.

See also 
 Up on Cripple Creek (Song by The Band)
 Cripple Creek (folk song)

References

Unincorporated communities in Wythe County, Virginia
Unincorporated communities in Virginia